The ultraproduct is a mathematical construction that appears mainly in abstract algebra and mathematical logic, in particular in model theory and set theory. An ultraproduct is a quotient of the direct product of a family of structures. All factors need to have the same signature. The ultrapower is the special case of this construction in which all factors are equal.

For example, ultrapowers can be used to construct new fields from given ones. The hyperreal numbers, an ultrapower of the real numbers, are a special case of this.

Some striking applications of ultraproducts include very elegant proofs of the compactness theorem and the completeness theorem, Keisler's ultrapower theorem, which gives an algebraic characterization of the semantic notion of elementary equivalence, and the Robinson–Zakon presentation of the use of superstructures and their monomorphisms to construct nonstandard models of analysis, leading to the growth of the area of nonstandard analysis, which was pioneered (as an application of the compactness theorem) by Abraham Robinson.

Definition

The general method for getting ultraproducts uses an index set  a structure  (assumed to be non-empty in this article) for each element  (all of the same signature), and an ultrafilter  on  

 

which compares components only relative to the ultrafilter   
This binary relation  is an equivalence relation on the Cartesian product  

 or 

Explicitly, if the -equivalence class of an element  is denoted by

then the ultraproduct is the set of all -equivalence classes

When  is a principal ultrafilter (which happens if and only if  contains its kernel ) then the ultraproduct is isomorphic to one of the factors. 
Since every ultrafilter on a finite set is principle, the index set  is consequently also usually infinite.

The ultraproduct acts as a filter product space where elements are equal if they are equal only at the filtered components (non-filtered components are ignored under the equivalence). 
One may define a finitely additive measure  on the index set  by saying  if  and  otherwise.  Then two members of the Cartesian product are equivalent precisely if they are equal almost everywhere on the index set.  The ultraproduct is the set of equivalence classes thus generated.

Finitary operations on the Cartesian product  are defined pointwise (for example, if  is a binary function then ). 
Other relations can be extended the same way:

In particular, if every  is an ordered field then so is the ultraproduct.

Ultrapower

An ultrapower is an ultraproduct for which all the factors  are equal. 

For every  let  denote the constant map  that is identically equal to  This constant map/tuple is an element of the Cartesian product  and so the assignment  defines a map  
The  is the map  that sends an element  to the -equivalence class of the constant tuple

Examples

The hyperreal numbers are the ultraproduct of one copy of the real numbers for every natural number, with regard to an ultrafilter over the natural numbers containing all cofinite sets. Their order is the extension of the order of the real numbers. For example, the sequence  given by  defines an equivalence class representing a hyperreal number that is greater than any real number.

Analogously, one can define nonstandard integers, nonstandard complex numbers, etc., by taking the ultraproduct of copies of the corresponding structures.

In the theory of large cardinals, a standard construction is to take the ultraproduct of the whole set-theoretic universe with respect to some carefully chosen ultrafilter  Properties of this ultrafilter  have a strong influence on (higher order) properties of the ultraproduct; for example, if  is -complete, then the ultraproduct will again be well-founded.  (See measurable cardinal for the prototypical example.)

Łoś's theorem

Łoś's theorem, also called , is due to Jerzy Łoś (the surname is pronounced , approximately "wash").

Let  be a signature,  an ultrafilter over a set  and for each  let  be a -structure. 
Then, for each  where  and for every -formula 

The theorem is proved by induction on the complexity of the formula  The fact that  is an ultrafilter (and not just a filter) is used in the negation clause, and the axiom of choice is needed at the existential quantifier step.  As an application, one obtains the transfer theorem for hyperreal fields.

Examples

Let  be a unary relation in the structure  and form the ultrapower of  Then the set  has an analog  in the ultrapower, and first-order formulas involving  are also valid for  For example, let  be the reals, and let  hold if  is a rational number. Then in  we can say that for any pair of rationals  and  there exists another number  such that  is not rational, and  Since this can be translated into a first-order logical formula in the relevant formal language, Łoś's theorem implies that  has the same property. That is, we can define a notion of the hyperrational numbers, which are a subset of the hyperreals, and they have the same first-order properties as the rationals.

Consider, however, the Archimedean property of the reals, which states that there is no real number  such that  for every inequality in the infinite list. Łoś's theorem does not apply to the Archimedean property, because the Archimedean property cannot be stated in first-order logic.

Direct limits of ultrapowers (ultralimits)

In model theory and set theory, the direct limit of a sequence of ultrapowers is often considered. In model theory, this construction can be referred to as an ultralimit or limiting ultrapower.

Beginning with a structure,  and an ultrafilter,  form an ultrapower,  Then repeat the process to form  and so forth. For each  there is a canonical diagonal embedding  At limit stages, such as  form the direct limit of earlier stages. One may continue into the transfinite.

Ultraproduct monad

The ultrafilter monad is the codensity monad of the inclusion of the category of finite sets into the category of all sets. 

So in this sense, ultraproducts are categorically inevitable. 
Explicitly, an object of  consists of a non-empty index set  and an indexed family  of sets. 
A morphism  between two objects consists of a function  between the index sets and a -indexed family  of function  
The category  is a full subcategory of this category of  consisting of all objects  whose index set  is finite. 
The codensity monad of the inclusion map  is then, in essence, given by

See also

Notes

Proofs

References

 
 

Mathematical logic
Model theory
Nonstandard analysis
Theorems in the foundations of mathematics
Universal algebra